Zlatoje Pavlović (born 22 May 1995) is a Serbian footballer, and assistant referee.

Career

Sloga Kraljevo
Born in Kraljevo, Pavlović passed youth categories of local club Sloga. He joined the first team in 2014. He started 2014–15 season, as a midfielder in the first squad, but later, after some players joined club, Pavlović moved on the bench. He made 10 Serbian First League and 1 cup appearance for the season, changing several position on the field. Pavlović also started 2015–16 Serbian League West season on the right-back position, but he was replaced in two future matches against Zvižd Kučevo, and later moved on the bench, noting some other matches until the end of first half-season. After Sloga relegated to the Morava Zone League, Pavlović started 2016–17 season as a team captain. At the beginning of 2017, Pavlović moved decided to join Prva Petoletka, after which he moved to the club for the rest of a season. In summer same year, he returned to his home club, Sloga Kraljevo.

Career statistics

References

External links
 

1995 births
Living people
Sportspeople from Kraljevo
Association football defenders
FK Sloga Kraljevo players
Serbian First League players
Serbian footballers